Wilmington is a city in Will County, Illinois, United States. Located on IL-53 along the east bank of the Kankakee River, it is approximately 60 miles south-west from downtown Chicago (the Chicago Loop). The population was 5,664 at the 2020 census. Surrounded by wetlands, Wilmington is known as "The Island City" and is directly south of Midewin National Tallgrass Prairie. The prairie is home to the largest American bison herd in Illinois.

History

Thomas Cox purchased land near Alden's Island in 1834 and built a sawmill, corn cracker, gristmill, and a carding machine facility all of which were powered by water wheels situated on a mill right off of the  Kankakee river which runs through Wilmington.

The town is also home to the historic Eagle Hotel located on the northwest corner of state Rt 53 (Rt 66) and Water street (Rt 102).
Wilmington was founded by Thomas Cox. It later became famous as a stop on U.S. Route 66, which followed the route of modern-day Illinois Route 53. The only rest-inn within the town is called "Van Duyne's" and is situated right on old Route 66.  A notable attraction for travelers along this route is the "Gemini Giant" Muffler Man type statue located next to the Launching Pad fast food restaurant. Countless photos of travelers, both domestic and foreign, standing at the base of the Gemini Giant are taken each year.

A bus-station scene from Planes, Trains & Automobiles was filmed in nearby Braidwood. The bus station was demolished in 2011. Wilmington is also home to Cinder Ridge Golf Course, located off of I-55. Wilmington was the scene of the brutal  Murder of Riley Fox

Geography
Midewin National Tallgrass Prairie is directly north of the city limits. The unincorporated area of Lakewood Shores is an extension of Wilmington.

One of Wilmington's most notable geographical features is a large island in the Kankakee River, much of which is occupied by a city park.  This island divides the river into a large channel and a smaller one which was used as a natural mill race during the early years of the city. The island is the source of the city's nickname, "The Island City."

Demographics

As of the census of 2000, there were 5,134 people, 1,991 households, and 1,318 families residing in the city. The racial makeup of the city was 97.14% White, 0.74% African American, 0.35% Native American, 0.29% Asian, 0.02% Pacific Islander, 0.60% from other races, and 0.86% from two or more races. Hispanic or Latino of any race were 1.95% of the population.

There were 1,991 households, out of which 34.9% had children under the age of 18 living with them, 52.1% were married couples living together, 9.8% had a female householder with no husband present, and 33.8% were non-families. 28.4% of all households were made up of individuals, and 10.3% had someone living alone who was 65 years of age or older. The average household size was 2.51 and the average family size was 3.10.

In the city, the population was spread out, with 26.3% under the age of 18, 8.3% from 18 to 24, 29.4% from 25 to 44, 22.9% from 45 to 64, and 13.1% who were 65 years of age or older. The median age was 36 years. For every 100 females, there were 93.3 males. For every 100 females age 18 and over, there were 92.7 males.

The median income for a household in the city was $45,659, and the median income for a family was $53,648. Males had a median income of $41,966 versus $25,625 for females. The per capita income for the city was $24,357. About 5.1% of families and 5.2% of the population were below the poverty line, including 5.3% of those under age 18 and 9.3% of those age 65 or over.

Notable people 

 Damien Anderson, National Football League player (born 1979)
 Harry Butcher, driver in the Indianapolis 500 (1892—1942)
 George Cutshaw, Major League Baseball player (1887—1973)
 John J. Feely, congressman (1875—1905)
 Leroy Ioas, Hand of the Cause of the Bahá'í Faith (1896–1965)
 Burt Keeley, Major League Baseball pitcher (1879-1952)
 Kiiara, singer (born 1995)
 Francis Joseph Magner, Roman Catholic bishop (1887-1947)
 Kelly Murphy (born 1989) Olympic Volleyball player
 Tanner Roark, Major League Baseball player (born 1986)
 Josephine Trott, composer (1874-1950)
 Dwight Smith Young (1892—1975) opened his photography studio in Wilmington

References

External links
 
City of Wilmington IL, Official Web Site
Catfish Days, Wilmington IL
Downtown, Wilmington IL

Cities in Illinois
Populated places established in 1836
Cities in Will County, Illinois
1836 establishments in Illinois